Fusiturricula bajanensis is a species of sea snails, a marine gastropod mollusc in the family Drilliidae.

It is also considered a synonym of Fusiturricula jaquensis (G.B. II Sowerby, 1850), but according to Fossilworks it is a synonym of † Fusiturricula springvaleensis Mansfield 1925

Description
The size of an adult shell varies between 35 mm and 85 mm.

Distribution
This species occurs in the demersal zone of the Caribbean Sea off St. Croix and Barbados.

References

 Tucker, J.K. 2004 Catalog of recent and fossil turrids (Mollusca: Gastropoda). Zootaxa 682:1–1295

External links

bajanensis
Gastropods described in 1969